Giovanni Vianna (born 26 January 2001) is a Brazilian professional skateboarder. He currently resides in the United States.

Career 
He won the Next X Skateboard Street event at the X Games Minneapolis 2018. He is also a member of Primitive Skateboarding company. He turned professional in 2020.

He made his debut appearance in the Olympics representing Brazil at the 2020 Summer Olympics where skateboarding was also added in Olympics for the very first time. During the 2020 Summer Olympics, he competed in men's street event.

References 

2001 births
Living people
Brazilian skateboarders
Olympic skateboarders of Brazil
Skateboarders at the 2020 Summer Olympics
People from Santo André, São Paulo
Sportspeople from São Paulo (state)